Comedy Cabaret is a British television programme broadcast 193839 on BBC Television. It was one of several spin-offs from the BBC series Cabaret. It was a live variety programme. There were five episodes, three in 1938 and two in 1939. The three 1938 episodes were produced by Harry Pringle, and one of the 1939 episodes by Arthur Ozmond. No episode has survived.

Performers 
, the following performers who appeared in Comedy Cabaret are subjects of Wikipedia articles. Their numbers of appearances (counting 18/22 January and 10/12 August 1938 as single episodes) are given in parentheses.
 Hermione Baddeley (190686). English character actress (1) 
 Jane Carr (190957), British actress (1) 
 Charles Heslop (18831966), British actor, compere (1) 
 Charlie Higgins, (before 1930), English comedian (1) 
 George Robey (18691954), English comedian (2)

See also 
 Cabaret (British TV series)
 Cabaret Cartoons
 Cabaret Cruise
 Eastern Cabaret
 Intimate Cabaret
 Western Cabaret

Notes

References

External links
 
 

1930s British television series
1938 British television series debuts
1939 British television series endings
Lost BBC episodes
BBC Television shows
Black-and-white British television shows
British variety television shows